The Professional Footballers' Association Fans' Player of the Year (often called the PFA Fans' Player of the Year, or simply the Fans' Player of the Year) award is given to footballers in the top four flights of English football, the Premier League, the Championship, League One and League Two.

The shortlist is compiled by the members of the Professional Footballers' Association (the PFA), and then the winner is voted for by the fans of the league. 

The award was first given in 2001, and was won by Steven Gerrard, Chris Bart-Williams, Brian Tinnion and Bobby Zamora, of Liverpool, Nottingham Forest, Bristol City and Brighton & Hove Albion respectively. Mohamed Salah is the record holder for winning the award 3 times and he's the current Premier League award winner.

List of winners
Highlighted players won the award for a second or third time.

2001

2002

2003

2004

2005

2006

2007

2008

2009

2010

2011

2012

2013
Not awarded

2014

2015

2016

2017

2018

2019

2020

2021

2022

Breakdown of winners

Winners by club
Information correct up to and including 2022.

Winners by country
Information correct up to and including 2022.

References

External links
The Official Website of the Professional Footballer's Association
Vote in the Official PFA Fans' Player Award

English football trophies and awards
England 4
Awards established in 2001
2001 establishments in England

ja:PFA年間最優秀選手賞
no:PFA Player of the Year